Bruce Watson may refer to:
Bruce Watson (American guitarist) (born 1959), American guitarist with Foreigner
Bruce Watson (Scottish guitarist) (born 1961), Canadian-born Scottish guitarist with Big Country
Bruce Watson (politician) (1910–1988), chairman of the Scottish National Party
Bruce Watson (songwriter) (born 1956), Australian songwriter
Bruce Watson (writer), American writer
E. Bruce Watson (born 1950), American geochemist

See also 
Watson (surname)